Carlos Rehermann (born in Montevideo, 1961) is a Uruguayan novelist and playwright, active since 1990. He has published four novels and staged five plays. He writes weekly columns on the arts. He won the Florencio Prize in 2002 for his play "A la guerra en taxi" ("To the front by cab", an Amedeo Modigliani stage biography). Florencio-Nominated, 2006, winner, "Solos en el escenario"-Prize—Centro Cultural de España—for "Basura" ("Filth"). Premio Nacional de Letras (National Literary Prize) for "El examen" ("The examination"), based on an episode of the life of Primo Levi, 2008. COFONTE Prize of Dramaturgy for "El examen", 2008.

All his plays were staged at international Theatre Festivals (Temporales Internacionales de Teatro de Puerto Montt, Chile—2001–2005; Festival Internacional de Teatro Unipersonal, Uruguay—2006, Bienal de Teatro de Paysandú—2006).
Rehermann is an architect from the Universidad de la República of Uruguay, but he has devoted his life to writing since 2000. He is currently Coordinator of Dramaturgy at the Ministry of Culture in Uruguay. 
He is also a press (El País Cultural), radio (Radio Uruguay) and television (TV Ciudad) journalist, focused on culture, literature and art issues.

Bibliography

Books

Los días de la luz deshilachada, Novel, 1990, Ed. Signos, Montevideo
El robo del cero Wharton, Novel, 1995, Ed. Trilce, Montevideo
El canto del pato, Novel, 2000, Ed. Planeta, Montevideo
Prometeo y la jarra de pandora, Drama, 2006, Ed. Artefato, Montevideo
Basura, in Solos en el escenario, Drama, 2006, Centro Cultural de España, Montevideo
Dodecameron, 2008, Novel, Ed. HUM, Montevideo
Mapa de la muerte, Drama, in Solos en el escenario, 2009, Centro Cultural de España, Montevideo
180, 2010, Novel, Ed. HUM, Montevideo
Basura y otros textos para teatro, Drama, 2012, Ed. Estuario, Montevideo.
El auto, 2015, Novel, Ed. Penguin Random House, Montevideo.

Tesoro, 2016, Novel, Ediciones de la Banda Oriental, Montevideo.

Plays

Congreso de sexología, 1999
Minotauros, 2000
A la guerra en taxi, 2002
Prometeo y la jarra de Pandora, 2005
Basura, 2006
El Examen, 2008
Mapa de la Muerte, 2009

Awards

1991 Mención en el concurso literario Municipal de Montevideo por Los días de la luz deshilachada.
2002 Premio Florencio [main theatre award in Uruguay] al mejor texto teatral de autor nacional [best stageplay] por A la guerra en taxi.
2005 Premio Centro Cultural de España a Prometeo y la jarra de Pandora.
2006 Primer Premio "Solos en el Escenario" (Centro Cultural de España) a Basura.
2006 Nominado al premio Florencio a mejor texto de autor nacionalo por Basura.
2008 Premio Nacional de Letras [National Literary Prize] por El examen.
2008 Primer Premio de dramaturgia "60 años de Teatro El Galpón", otorgado por COFONTE, por El examen.
2009 Mención "Solos en el Escenario II" (Centro Cultural de España) por Mapa de la muerte.
2009 Premio Iberesecena por el proyecto Recto/Verso.
2010 Premio Morosoli de Plata a la trayectoria como dramaturgo.
2012 Segundo Premio Anual de Literatura [National Literary Prize] por la novela 180.
2014 Primer Premio Anual de Literatura (Ministerio de Educación y Cultura de Uruguay) por el conjunto de su obra para teatro editada, "Basura y otros textos para teatro".
2016 Primer Premio "Narradores de Banda Oriental" por su novela "Tesoro" (Ediciones de la Banda Oriental, 2016).

External links
Theatre Website and texts: http://www.bibliotecah.org.uy/teatro
Web site: http://www.carlosrehermann.com
El País Website: http://www.elpais.com.uy
TV Ciudad website: https://web.archive.org/web/20090317101319/http://www.teveciudad.org.uy/
Radio Show Website: http://www.sodre.gub.uy.asp1-4.websitetestlink.com/Sodre/Sodre/Servicios/RadiodifusiónNacionalSodre/Radiosyservicios/Uruguay1050AM/Programación/Tormentadecerebros/Quienessomos/tabid/255/Default.aspx
Iberescena: https://web.archive.org/web/20100510071348/http://www.iberescena.org/ayudas/ayudas.asp

Living people
1961 births
Writers from Montevideo
Uruguayan novelists
Male novelists
Uruguayan male writers
Uruguayan dramatists and playwrights
Male dramatists and playwrights
Uruguayan people of German descent